Silkheart Records is a Swedish record company and label dedicated to improvised music and free jazz.

Lars-Olof Gustavsson and Keith Knox founded Silkheart in 1985. In 1991, Jimmy Johnson of Forced Exposure suggested that Silkheart "could easily be considered for the new ESP-Disk throne." The Penguin Guide to Jazz describes the four albums that Dennis González recorded for the label as "part of a determined effort to wrest creative initiative back from New York and the West Coast". Charles Brackeen (whom Silkheart's management and González had coaxed out of retirement) recorded three albums for Silkheart.

Releases
 101 Dennis González New Dallas Quartet – Stefan
 102 Steve Lacy Sextet – The Gleam
 103 Steve Lacy Quartet – One Fell Swoop
 104 Ahmed Abdullah Quartet – Liquid Magic
 105 Charles Brackeen Quartet – Bannar
 106 Dennis González New Dallas Sextet – Namesake
 107 Michael Bisio Quartet – In Seattle
 108 Ethnic Heritage Ensemble – Ancestral Song
 109 Ahmed Abdullah  – Ahmed Abdullah and the Solomonic Quintet
 110 Charles Brackeen Quartet – Attainment
 111 Charles Brackeen Quartet – Worshippers Come Nigh
 112 Dennis González New Dallasorleanssippi – Debenge – Debenge
 113 David S. Ware Trio – Passage to Music
 114 Booker T. Williams – Go Tell It on the Mountain
 115 Charles Gayle Quartet – Always Born
 116 Charles Gayle Trio – Homeless
 117 Charles Gayle Trio – Spirits Before
 118 Charles Tyler + Brus Trio – Autumn in Paris
 119 William Hooker Quartet – Lifeline
 120 Other Dimensions in Music – Other Dimensions In Music
 121 Denis Charles Triangle – Queen Mary
 122 Rob Brown Trio – Breath Rhyme
 123 William Hooker Ensemble – The Firmament Fury
 124 Dennis González New Dallas Angeles – The Desert Wind
 125 Joel Futterman Quartet – Vision in Time
 126 Roscoe Mitchell + Brus Trio – After Fallen Leaves
 127 David S. Ware Quartet – Great Bliss, Vol. 1
 128 David S. Ware Quartet – Great Bliss, Vol. 2
 129 Matthew Shipp Quartet – Points
 130 Various artists – Spirit of New Jazz
 131 Joel Futterman Trio – Berlin Images
 132 Ernest Dawkins New Horizons Ensemble – South Side Street Songs
 133 Jim Hobbs Trio – Babadita
 134 Charles Gayle Quartet – Translations
 135 Hal Russell & Joel Futterman Quartet – Naked Colours
 136 Jim Hobbs Fully Celebrated Orchestra – Peace & Pig Grease
 137 Charles Gayle Quartet – Raining Fire
 138 Bob Ackerman Trio – Old & New Magic
 139 Roy Campbell Pyramid – Communion
 140 Ernest Dawkins New Horizons Ensemble – Chicago Now Vol. 1
 141 Ernest Dawkins New Horizons Ensemble – Chicago Now Vol. 2
 142 Ethnic Heritage Ensemble – 21st Century Union March
 143 The Joel Futterman & Kidd Jordan Quintet – Nickelsdorf Konfrontation
 144 Steve Lacy – 5 x Monk 5 x Lacy
 145 David S. Ware Quartet – Oblations and Blessings
 146 Andrew Cyrille – Richard Teitelbaum Duo – Double Clutch
 147 William Hooker – Billy Bang Duo – Joy (Within)!
 148 Assif Tsahar Trio – Ain Sof
 149 AALY Trio + Ken Vandermark – Hidden in the Stomach
 150 Ethnic Heritage Ensemble – Ka – Real
 151 Borgmann / Morris / Charles Trio – The Last Concert – Dankeschön
 152 Kidd Jordan Quartet – New Orleans Festival Suite
 153 Heinz Geisser & Guerino Mazzola Duo – Folia / The Unam Concert
 154 Heinz Geisser & Guerino Mazzola] Duo – Someday
 155 Sirone Bang Ensemble – Configuration
 156 Matt Lavelle Trio – Spiritual Power
 157 Charles Gayle Quartet – Blue Shadows
 158 Other Dimensions in Music featuring Fay Victor – Kaiso Stories

See also
 List of record labels
 Ayler Records, Sister label

References

External links 
 Official site
 Ayler Records, Silkheart's Sister Label, Official site

Swedish record labels
Jazz record labels
Record labels established in 1985
1985 establishments in Sweden